Duncan Grant was a British painter and designer.

Duncan Grant may also refer to:

Duncan Grant (rower) (born 1980), New Zealand rower
Sir Duncan Grant, 13th Baronet, of the Grant baronets

See also
Grant (name)